Monte Milone is meteorite that fell in 1846 in central Italy.

History
Monte Milone fell on 8 May 1846, in Pollenza in the central Italian region of Marche.
It was found by the mineralogist Giovanni Strüver and then bought and described by Monsignor Lavinio de' Medici Spada(1846).

Composition and classification
It is a L5 type ordinary chondrite.

Notes

See also 
 Glossary of meteoritics
 Meteorite

External links 
 Meteoritical Bulletin Database

Meteorites found in Italy
Geology of Italy
1846 in Europe
1846 in Italy
History of le Marche
1846 in science